Olympian Publishing is a publishing house with offices in Chicago, IL, USA.  

Founded in 2005 by Peter Weglarz, the books released from Olympian Publishing have been noteworthy for high production quality, specifically re-creating the feel of vintage or antique books.  In 2006 Olympian secured the rights in early 2006 to publish Dan Brereton's Nocturnals.

Titles
 The Union of Hope and Sadness: The Art of Gail Potocki (2006) (with introduction by Jim Rose of The Jim Rose Circus)

An exploration of the Symbolist paintings of Gail Potocki; with more than 100 works represented and discussed, the 208 page hardcover book also includes essays from Richard Metzger, the host of BBC's Disinformation: the Series and neuroscientist Marina Korsakova-Kreyn, and portraits of Jim and Bébé Rose, Joe Coleman, Grant Morrison, and Claudio Carniero of Cirque du Soleil.

 Chamber of Mystery: Witchcraft (2007) (Various artists and authors, with introduction by Dan Brereton featuring characters from the Nocturnals)

Reprints thirteen stories from classic 1950s horror comics.

 A Nocturnal Alphabet (2007) (by Daniel Brereton)

A macabre children's poem featuring the Nocturnals, illustrated with paintings by Dan Brereton.

 Nocturnals Volume One: Black Planet and Other Stories (2007) (by Daniel Brereton)

Reprints the earliest of the Nocturnals comic stories, written and painted by Dan Brereton (with introduction by Thomas Negovan)

External links
 http://www.olympianpublishing.com
 http://www.nocturnals.com

Book publishing companies based in Illinois
Publishing companies established in 2005
Companies based in Chicago